Lesa Lesa..., also referred to as Laysa Laysa,  is a 2003 Indian Tamil-language film directed by Priyadarshan and produced by Vikram Singh, who previously produced 12B. The film stars  Shaam and Trisha, while Vivek, Radharavi and Sreenivasan play supporting roles. Madhavan appears in a guest appearance. Cinematography is handled by Tirru, while the film's score and soundtrack were composed by Harris Jayaraj. The film is a remake of the 1998 Malayalam film Summer in Bethlehem, which was co-written by Ranjith and Venu Nagavally.

Plot

Chandru's grandfather plans to visit him but Chandru has spent all his money. As a result, he decides to pose as the co-owner of his friend Rakesh's riches till his grandfather stays with them. When Balamani "Bala", is the most favored and most fun of family comes to the family. Rakesh, eventually falls in love with  Bala. Bala becomes sober — she says that she likes him, but says that she's already married to a college lecturer, Deva Narayanan. Rakesh found Bala suspicious and in an interaction she revealed that her husband is going to be hanged soon on a public issue and she will also end her life same day he is hanged. 
Rakesh, with aid of his foster uncle met Deva and discloses his love over Bala and request Deva to convince her to live life after his death. On last request by Deva, Bala came to meet her with Rakesh. Deva lies to her that he did not love her and whet he had is only a lust. But Bala unable digest the lie, went out in halfway. Whether Bala marry Rakesh thereafter is the rest of the story.

Cast 

 Shaam as Rakesh
 Trisha as Balamani
 Madhavan as Deva Narayanan (cameo appearance)
 Vivek as Chandru
 Radharavi as Chandru's grandfather
 Sreenivasan as Pandi
 Haneefa as Kailasam
 Innocent as the man who wants to kill Chandru
 Sathyapriya as Chandru's grandmother
 Fathima Babu as Varalakshmi
 Mayilsamy as a fraud
 Kovai Senthil as a victim's father
 Subhi as Chandru's cousin
 Priyanka as Chandru's cousin
 Jyothi Rana as Chandru's cousin
 Nandhu as Nandu
 Nilam as Chandru's cousin
 Major Ravi as Deva’s friend
 Nishanth as Sekhar
 Ravikumar as Rakesh's foster uncle
 Rajendran as Deva’s friend (uncredited)

Production
Despite the box office failure of their previous venture 12B, Vikram Singh hired Shaam and composer Harris Jayaraj again for his next venture directed by veteran Priyadarshan. The story of the film was partially adapted from the 1998 Malayalam film Summer in Bethlehem, which was co-written by Ranjith, Sreenivasan and Venu Nagavally and Priyadarshan developed a new screenplay. The project initially developed under the title Kanmani Nee Vara Kaathirunthen, before the makers changed it to Lesa Lesa after hearing the song composed by Jayaraj for the film.

Lesa Lesa became the first film Trisha had signed, and recalled that she had been trying to avoid films until she finished college but veteran director Priyadarshan's calls were "criminal to refuse". She revealed she had no idea about the script of Lesa Lesa when she agreed to do the film and only later did Shaam and her have a one-hour narration of the script. During the making of the film, Trisha was dubbed as the "most happening debutante in Tamil film industry", and signed on to three other projects before the release of Lesa Lesa - Ennaku 20 Unnaku 18, Mounam Pesiyadhe  and Thiruda, which she later opted out from. The story of the film also required a guest appearance and Priyadarshan chose Madhavan for the role, despite initially considering Arjun. The team also hired Radharavi and Sathyapriya along with four comedians - Vivek, Sreenivasan, Cochin Haneefa and Innocent to play pivotal roles in the film. Art director Sabu Cyril constructed a house in Ooty for the film. Venket Ram took the film's principal photographs, while Siddharth Chandrasekhar of Mittra Media made his debut as a publicity designer with the project.

In order to concentrate on the project, Vikram Singh briefly shelved his other venture, Sivakumar's Acham Thavir starring Madhavan and Jyothika. The team had a forty-day schedule at Ooty, beginning at 6 and winding up at 6. The film was initially set to release in the Diwali season of 2002 but was delayed. The film was to release on Pongal of 2003, but was delayed again. The delay meant that Lesa Lesa did not become Trisha's first film release, with pundits describing the film as "jinxed".

Release
Malathi Rangarajan of The Hindu gave the film a positive review mentioning that "Shaam once again shows that he is a natural performer" and that the "surprise packet is the entry of Madhavan and as a fiery, forthright and straightforward professor, he makes a mark". The critic added that "every frame of "Lesa Lesa" spells aesthetics, thanks to award winning efforts by art director Sabu Cyril and cinematographer Tirru", concluding that "if one can forget the avoidable protractions in the second half, Vikram Singh's "Lesa Lesa" is a visual treat". Sify praised the performances of the cast, the music, the cinematography, and the art. Malini Mannath of Chennai Online opined that "A clean family entertainer from producer Vikram Singh, the film bogged down by some problems took a long time to hit the theaters. But fortunately, it does not look dated, and seems worth the wait".

Initial collections were not so impressive, so distributors in Coimbatore and Madurai allegedly re-printed posters of the film which marketed Madhavan, who appeared in the film in a guest appearance, as the lead star of the film over Shaam to bank in on his star image. In 2004, Priyadarshan was asked by the Malayalam Film Association to compensate producer Siyad Kokker for making Lesa Lesa in Tamil based on Kokker's Summer In Bethlehem. The film was criticised for its long Antakshari sequence.

Soundtrack

The movie's songs are set to the tunes of Harris Jayaraj and lyrics by Vaali. For the first time in Tamil cinema, the team released a single, the title song, priced at nine rupees. Vikram Singh chose to release the audio of the film at a cheap rate, to avoid piracy.

Accolades 
International Tamil Film Awards - 2003

Legacy 
The song "Mudhal Mudhalai" inspired the name of a 2007 film.  Trisha later worked with Priyadarshan in 2010, when the director chose to giver her a debut in Hindi films through his venture, Khatta Meetha. In 2020, The Times of India stated that "Actor Vivek's comedy in this film is highly enjoyable and very popular even today".

References

External links
 

2003 films
2000s Tamil-language films
Tamil remakes of Malayalam films
Films directed by Priyadarshan
Films scored by Harris Jayaraj
Films shot in Ooty